This is a list of educational institutions in Thalassery, a city on the Malabar Coast of Kerala, India.

Schools 
 MMHSS(MUBARAK) SAIDARPALLY
Basel Evangelical Mission Parsi High School
Sacred Heart Girls' High School
St.Joseph's Higher Secondary School
GVHSS Chirakkara
Govt Brennan HSS
Govt Girls HSS
GGHSS Thiruvangad
GVHSS Koduvally
GVHSS Kadirur

AKG Memorial GHSS 
RVHSS Chokli

Colleges 
 Govt Brennen College
 College of Engineering, Thalassery
 Nettur Technical Training Foundation
 Thalassery Govt College, Chokli
 Thalassery Nursing College
 Malabar Cancer Center

Universities
 Kannur University campus, Palayad, Thalassery City

See also
List of schools in India

References 

Thalassery
Education in Thalassery